534 is the fourth studio album by rapper Memphis Bleek. It was released by Get Low Records, Roc-A-Fella Records, and Def Jam Recordings on May 17, 2005. The album contains 14 songs, including the hit single "Like That" produced by Swizz Beatz. A single by Bleek's mentor and childhood friend Jay-Z entitled "Dear Summer" was produced by Just Blaze. Other guests include Young Gunz, M.O.P., and the first ever appearance from Rihanna.

The title is a reference to the address of Marcy Houses, 534 Flushing Ave.,  where Bleek and Jay-Z grew up.

Track listing

Samples
"534"

"Interlude"
 "Summer Song" Performed by Lisa Koch

"Dear Summer"
 "Morning Sunrise" performed by Weldon Irvine

"Like That"
 "Everybody Plays The Fool" by The Main Ingredient
 "Loves Me Like A Rock" by The Dixie Hummingbirds

"The One"
 "I Can't Breakaway" by Natalie Cole

"First, Last And Only"
 "Never Know What You Can Do (Give It A Try)" by Lee Hutson

"Get Low"
 "Bootleggin" by Simtec & Wylie

"Smoke The Pain Away"
 "I Think I'll Stay Home Today" by Billy Paul

"Alright"
 "Trace of Your Love" by Joe Simon

"All About Me"
 "Slow Tongue" by Millie Jackson

"Straight Path"
 "Something" by Al Green

References

2005 albums
Memphis Bleek albums
Albums produced by Swizz Beatz
Albums produced by 9th Wonder
Albums produced by Irv Gotti
Albums produced by Just Blaze
Albums produced by Bink (record producer)
Def Jam Recordings albums
Roc-A-Fella Records albums